Lagria cuprina is a species of beetles in the family Tenebrionidae.

Description
Body is oblong, prothorax is almost square, thorax and prothorax are densely punctuated. Elytra are reddish or coppery.

Distribution
This species is present in the tropical Africa.

References

 Checklists of insects and mites recorded on crops in Ghana
 Tropical Grain Legume Bulletin

Lagriinae
Beetles of Africa
Beetles described in 1858
Taxa named by James Thomson